SAG Team or Stop and Go Team is a motorcycle racing team from Spain, currently competing in the Moto2 World Championship.

History
The team debuted in the 2006 season. At that time competing in the 250cc class with their riders Jordi Carchano and Fabricio Perren. The principal of this team is Edu Perales, who is Spanish.

SAG Team rider, Luis Salom died an fatal accident during FP2 for the 2016 Catalan motorcycle Grand Prix.

Results

† – Rider deceased
Notes
* Season still in progress.

References

External links
 

Motorcycle racing teams
Motorcycle racing teams established in 2006